Kineococcus radiotolerans is a radiation-resistant, motile, coccus-shaped, gram-positive bacterium.

References

Further reading
Ottesen, Andrea Ruth. The Microbial Ecology and Horticultural Sustainability of Organically and Conventionally Managed Apples. ProQuest, 2008.

External links

Type strain of Kineococcus radiotolerans at BacDive -  the Bacterial Diversity Metadatabase

Actinomycetia
Radiodurants
Bacteria described in 2002